The Sri Lanka cricket team toured Bangladesh, playing two Test matches, a two-match International Twenty20 series and a three-match One Day International series against the Bangladesh national team from 27 January to 22 February 2014.

Squads

±Late Addition

Test series

1st Test

2nd Test

T20I series

1st T20I

2nd T20I

ODI series

1st ODI

2nd ODI

3rd ODI

Statistics

Tests and ODIs
Sri Lanka
Kaushal Silva made his 1st Test century in the first innings of the 1st Test.
Mahela Jayawardene made his 33rd Test century and his 7th Test double-century in the first innings of the 1st Test.
Kithuruwan Vithanage made his 1st Test century in the first innings of the 1st Test.
Kumar Sangakkara made his 34th Test century and his 1st Test triple-century in the first innings of the 2nd Test.
Kumar Sangakkara passed 11,000 Test runs in the first innings of the 2nd Test.
Kumar Sangakkara made his 35th Test century in the second innings of the 2nd Test.
Dinesh Chandimal made his 3rd Test century in the second innings of the 2nd Test.
 Kumar Sangakkara made his 17th ODI century in the 2nd ODI.
 Kusal Perera made his 1st ODI century in the 3rd ODI.

Bangladesh
Shamsur Rahman made his 1st Test century in the first innings of the 2nd Test.
Imrul Kayes made his 1st Test century in the first innings of the 2nd Test.
Mominul Haque made his 3rd Test century in the second innings of the 2nd Test.

References

External links
 Sri Lanka in Bangladesh  on ESPNcricinfo

Sri Lankan cricket tours of Bangladesh
Bangladeshi cricket seasons from 2000–01
International cricket competitions in 2013–14
2014 in Bangladeshi cricket
2014 in Sri Lankan cricket